Abdel Moneim El-Husseiny (born 7 August 1966) is an Egyptian former foil fencer. He competed at the 1984 and 1988 Summer Olympics and currently the vice president of the FIE in the world and the president of the Fencing federation in Egypt.

Controversy 2022 
In November 2022 he was in the center of a controversy scandal when several FIE members were trying to silence the discussion of safety for Women and HBTQ.

Otto Drakenberg, Chairman for the Swedish Fencing Federation, was trying to raise concerns for Women and HBTQ-people if choosing Saudi Arabia as the host country for the World Cadets and Juniors Fencing Championships 2024. His speech was concerining that women, lesbian, gay, bisexual and transgender participants might end up not going to the championship due to safety concerns and the risk of be imprisoned in the country.

During his speech, some members in the FIE started yelling and hitting the tables to drown the scheduled speech. Abdel, as Vice President for FIE, publicly told Otto  to not talk about such topics, supporting the undemocratic actions from parts of the delegates. Although Abdel together with the yelling delegates continued trying to silence the topic, Otto was somewhat successfully able to finish his speech. 

"Excuse me, excuse me, now we here this to speak on the sport. Nothing to do with what you are going to say now. Please stop it immediately! You should stop immediately!" - Abdel

The incident resulted in FIE and Abdel being reported to International Olympic Committee for hindering a delegate to discuss a topic on the agenda.

References

External links
 

1966 births
Living people
Egyptian male foil fencers
Olympic fencers of Egypt
Fencers at the 1984 Summer Olympics
Fencers at the 1988 Summer Olympics
20th-century Egyptian people
21st-century Egyptian people